Tasmania is well known for its bush walking tracks. Even though Tasmania is a small island, more than forty percent of its land area is protected.  Therefore, there are plenty of places to go bush walking in Tasmania.

Bush-walking tracks

 
Bush-walking tracks, Tasmania